Polarus Steamship Company was founded in 1918, and again in 1923 in New York City by Tikhon Nicholas Agapeyeff (1891-1931). Tikhon N. Agapeyeff's 1918 frim, operated for only about two years. In March 1921, Agapeyeff sold the first Polarus Steamship Company to the C. M. Fetterolf Company for $250,000.  The next incorporation in 1923 was a partnership of Agapeyeff, Marcel Levy, and Charles S. Dunaif. Marcel Levy was an attorney and Charles S. Dunaif was an exporter. 

Tikhon N. Agapeyeff was born on July 21, 1891 in Russia. Agapeyeff was a commander of a ship in the Russian Imperial Navy. At the outbreak of the Russian Revolution in 1917, he fled to Liverpool, England and then to New York City, United States arriving on July 1, 1917 aboard the SS Saint Paul. He found work at a United States Navy Ordnance Depot during World War I. Post-war Agapeyeff was a ship broker and started the first Polarus Shipping Company in 1918 with Agapeyeff as president and Carlos M. Fetterolf as vice president. Agapeyeff sold the frim on August 1, 1921 to C. M. Fetterolf Company.  
 

In the 1923 incorporation of Polarus Steamship Company, Hendrik Robert Jolles (1889-1949) was president and Dunaif vice president. On July 12, 1923, Apapeyeff became a naturalized citizen of the United States. On December 4, 1931, while on vacation in Halifax, Nova Scotia, Canada with his wife, Violet (1901-1975), and daughter, Cyrus (1921-1996), Apapeyeff had a heart attack and died.

For 10 years Agapeyeff was also the managing director of the Sonora Timber Company. The Sonora Timber Company, of Sonora, Nova Scotia, was founded to log and export pulpwood to the United States.

World War II
Polarus Steamship Company fleet of ships were used to help the World War II effort. During World War II Polarus Steamship Company operated Merchant navy ships for the United States Shipping Board. During World War II Polarus Steamship Company was active with charter shipping with the Maritime Commission and War Shipping Administration. Polarus Steamship Company operated Liberty ships and Victory ships for the merchant navy. The ship was run by its Polarus Steamship Company crew and the US Navy supplied United States Navy Armed Guards to man the deck guns and radio.

Ships
Post war Liberty ships, war surplus:
SS Coastal Ringleader
 Michael J. Owens   
 William D. Bloxham, acquired in 1969 renamed Mitera Irini  
 , acquired in 1956 renamed Transporter 
 Patrick B. Whalen, acquired in 1953 renamed Charles C. Dunaif  
 Joseph I. Kemp, acquired in 1956 renamed Adolph Sperling 
 , acquired in 1949 renamed Ocenanic 
 John M. Morehead, acquired in 1949 renamed  Polarus Sailor 
 William R. Lewis, acquired in 1950 renamed Polaruse Carrier
 Lafcadio Hearn, acquired in 1948 renamed Polarussoil 
 Francis A. Retka, acquired in 1956 renamed I. R. Lashings 

	
other
SS Franklin Berwis
SS Coastal Guide
	
Liberty ships operated for World War II:

SS Charles A. Draper
   
 Patrick B. Whalen  
 Earl Layman   
 Michael J. Owens  
 Earl Layman  
 Charles G. Coutant  
 Joseph B. Eastman  
 John McDonogh  

 Raymond V. Ingersoll  
 Michael J. Owens   
 Augustin Stahl  
 James B. Hickok  
	
	
Victory ships operated:
 Fayetteville Victor  
 Parkersburg Victory

See also

World War II United States Merchant Navy

References 

Defunct shipping companies of the United States
American companies established in 1918